= Kalambaste =

Village in Maharashtra

- Village
- Interactive map of Kalambaste
- Country: India
- State: Maharashtra

Kalambaste is a village in the Chiplun Block of Ratnagiri district, Maharashtra, India. Its pin code is 415605. The village has its own Panchayat Samiti. The nearest railway station is Chiplun.
